Dorte Lohse Rasmussen (born 16 March 1971) is a road cyclist from Denmark. She participated at the 2005, 2006, 2007 and 2011 UCI Road World Championships.

References

1971 births
Danish female cyclists
Living people
Place of birth missing (living people)
21st-century Danish women